Sayer (also Romanized as Sāyer, Saier, and Sair) is a village in Kuhsarat Rural District, in the Central District of Minudasht County, Golestan Province, Iran. At the 2006 census, its population was 461, in 98 families.

References 

Populated places in Minudasht County